Nayib Armando Bukele Ortez (born 24 July 1981) is a Salvadoran politician and businessman who is the 43rd president of El Salvador, serving since 1 June 2019. He is the first president since José Napoleón Duarte (1984–1989) not to have been elected as the candidate of one of the country's two major political parties: the left-wing Farabundo Martí National Liberation Front (FMLN) and the right-wing Nationalist Republican Alliance (ARENA).

Bukele served as mayor of Nuevo Cuscatlán for three years from 2012 to 2015, and then served three years as mayor of San Salvador, the nation's capital, from 2015 to 2018. After winning both mayoral elections as a member of the FMLN, in 2017 Bukele was expelled from the party. In 2018 he established his own political party: Nuevas Ideas (NI). He sought to run for president in the 2019 election with the center-left Democratic Change (CD); however, the Supreme Electoral Court (TSE) dissolved the CD, forcing Bukele to instead run with the center-right Grand Alliance for National Unity (GANA). He won the election with 53 percent of the vote.

El Salvador's murder rate decreased to historic lows during Bukele's tenure, falling by over 50 percent during his first year in office. Although Bukele attributed the decrease in murders to his deployment of thousands of police and soldiers to gang strongholds and an increase in prison security, his government has been accused by the United States of secretly negotiating with Mara Salvatrucha (MS-13) to reduce the number of murders. Since March 2022, Bukele's government has arrested over 65,000 people with alleged gang affiliations following a significant spike in murders, leading to accusations of human rights violations being committed by El Salvador's security forces.

Bukele has maintained high approval ratings among Salvadorans throughout his tenure, but has been accused of governing in an authoritarian manner. In February 2020, Bukele was criticized by the opposition for sending soldiers into the Legislative Assembly to encourage the passage of a bill that would fund additional purchases of equipment for the police and armed forces. In May 2021, he led a move to fire the attorney general and five supreme court judges of El Salvador, which the United States Department of State and Organization of American States (OAS) denounced as democratic backsliding. Following the approval of bitcoin as legal tender in El Salvador in September 2021, protests against Bukele's government took place. His announcement that he would run for reelection in 2024 led to criticism by constitutional law experts and organizations that presidential reelection violated the country's constitution.

Bukele has made several international visits to foreign nations as president, including the United States, Japan, China, Qatar, Guatemala, and Turkey. Additionally, he also made official visits to Taiwan and Israel during his tenure as mayor of San Salvador. Bukele has been critical of other Latin American leaders, including Daniel Ortega, Nicolás Maduro, and Juan Orlando Hernández, calling them "dictators".

Early life and education

Nayib Armando Bukele Ortez was born on 24 July 1981 in San Salvador. He is a son of Armando Bukele Kattán and Olga Ortez de Bukele. According to The Times of Israel, Bukele's paternal grandparents were Palestinian Christians from Jerusalem and Bethlehem while his maternal grandmother was Catholic and his maternal grandfather was Greek Orthodox. His father later converted to Islam and became an imam.

Bukele studied law at the Central American University, but later ended his studies and founded his first company at age 18. According to a 2017 article in the digital newspaper El Faro, Bukele owned Yamaha Motors El Salvador, a company that sells and distributes Yamaha products in El Salvador. He was also the director and president of OBERMET, S.A. DE C.V. in 2011.

Early political career

Mayor of Nuevo Cuscatlán
On 11 March 2012, he was elected mayor of Nuevo Cuscatlán, in the department of La Libertad, representing a coalition of the Farabundo Martí National Liberation Front (FMLN) with 2,754 votes (49.72%) and Democratic Change (CD) with 108 votes (1.95%), for a total of 2,862 votes (50.68%), defeating the incumbent Nationalist Republican Alliance (ARENA), which won 2,585 votes (46.67%). He took office on 1 May 2012.

During his mayorship, he provided all adults of Nuevo Cuscatlán over the age of 55 a monthly basket to cover basic nutritional needs. Before Bukele took office, Nuevo Cuscatlán had around 12 homicides per year, but during his three-year term, only one homicide was reported. He also offered scholarships to all youths with a GPA above a 3.5 to be able to go any university in El Salvador, believing that such awards for academic achievements would help combat crime among youths. Throughout his term, he donated his salary to the scholarships that he was offering for youths in Nuevo Cuscatlán. On 21 January 2015, Bukele inaugurated a new boulevard which connected Nuevo Cuscatlán with Huizúcar and Antiguo Cuscatlán. Bukele performed much of his works as mayor with funding from ALBA Petróleos, an association owned by the Venezuelan oil company PDVSA.

Mayor of San Salvador

In the municipal elections of 2015, he won the mayoralty of San Salvador, the capital city of El Salvador, representing a coalition of the FMLN and the Salvadoran Progressive Party (PSP) that won 89,164 votes (50.37% of total). His main challenger, businessman and former ARENA deputy Edwin Zamora in a coalition with the National Coalition Party (PCN), received only 82,288 votes (46.49%). The latter party had controlled the city during the previous six years. Bukele took office on 1 May 2015.

Upon taking office, Bukele reverted the names of two streets in San Salvador: Calle Mayor Roberto D'Aubuisson to Calle San Antonio Abad A La Vía and Boulevard Colonel José Arturo Castellanos to Boulevard Venezuela. Both names were changed by his predecessor, Norman Quijano, during his term, the former being named after Major Roberto D'Aubuisson, who ordered the assassination of Archbishop Óscar Romero in 1980 during the Salvadoran Civil War and founded ARENA in 1981, and the latter being named after Colonel José Castellanos Contreras, who saved 40,000 Jews from the Holocaust in Central Europe by providing them fake Salvadoran passports. Bukele began his "revitalization" of San Salvador with the relocation of street sellers, a change which was positively received by the public and the media. He also built the Cuscatlán Market and San Salvador's first municipal library.

In February 2017, Bukele visited Taipei, the capital of Taiwan, and met Taiwanese President Tsai Ing-wen to "enhance" the sister city relationship between San Salvador and Taipei. In February 2018, he attended the 32nd International Mayors Conference in Jerusalem, where he was seen praying at the Western Wall, and revealed that his wife's grandfather was a Sephardic Jew. During the last months of his term, Bukele brushed up the historic center of San Salvador by expanding roads, remodeling buildings, and rebuilding electric and telecommunication lines, all costing around $5.7 million.

Expulsion from the FMLN
On 10 October 2017, Bukele was expelled from the FMLN, accused by the FMLN Ethics Tribunal of promoting internal division within the party, verbally and physically attacking fellow party member Xóchitl Marchelli, performing defamatory acts against the political party, and heavily attacking and criticizing incumbent FMLN President Salvador Sánchez Cerén. Bukele did not attend the hearing scheduled for 7 October 2017 by the FMLN Ethics Tribunal, arguing that they were biased in favor of the plaintiffs. The FMLN lost 20 municipalities and 8 seats in the Legislative Assembly in the subsequent 2018 legislative election. Some political experts have speculated that the losses were in part due to the expulsion of Bukele from the FMLN.

Election as president

After Bukele's expulsion from the FMLN, his aspirations towards 2019 moved in the direction of participating in the presidential elections as an independent who rejects the current political system. He had wanted to run for president as a member of the FMLN; however, resistance from party leadership prevented him from doing so. He established the political party Nuevas Ideas ("New Ideas") with the goal of making it a political party where he could run as a candidate for the presidency of El Salvador.

Following the announcement of his presidential aspirations, he was opposed by both the ruling FMLN party on the political left, and ARENA on the political right, as they blocked any attempts for him to found his own political party and politically canceled any party that he has attempted to use for his candidacy, as they did so with Democratic Change. His attempt to run with the party ended when the Supreme Electoral Court (TSE) effectively dissolved the party. Bukele eventually joined the center-right Grand Alliance for National Unity (GANA) party to mount his presidential bid.

On 3 February 2019, Bukele announced that he had won the presidential elections with ease. Challengers Carlos Calleja of the ARENA and Hugo Martínez of the FMLN conceded defeat. He won 53 percent of the vote, thereby eliminating the need for a run-off election. He is the first candidate to win the presidency since the end of the Salvadoran Civil War who did not represent either of the major two parties. In his victory speech he declared, "Today we have turned the page on the postwar period."

Presidency

Bukele assumed office on 1 June 2019, succeeding Sánchez Cerén. Bukele announced a cabinet of sixteen people made up of eight men and eight women, who will serve until 1 June 2024.

Political crises

In February 2020, Bukele wanted to secure a 109 million dollar loan from the United States to go to increase funding for the Territorial Control Plan. His plan was opposed by the ARENA and the FMLN, citing that his previous policies regarding law enforcement had increased militarization of the National Civil Police. Bukele rallied supporters to call upon the opposition to approve the loan, and on 6 February 2020, Bukele invoked article 167 of the Constitution of El Salvador, calling on the Council of Ministers to convene in the Legislative Assembly on 9 February 2020. When the meeting was supposed to occur, Bukele ordered soldiers into the Legislative Assembly to intimidate legislators to approve the loan. The incident, known in El Salvador as 9F, was condemned by the opposition as an attempted self-coup and the Supreme Court of El Salvador prohibited Bukele from exercising powers not granted in the Constitution.

Bukele's Nuevas Ideas won a majority of the seats in the Legislative Assembly in the 2021 legislative elections, and on 1 May 2021, Nuevas Ideas made a coalition with three other political parties, gaining control of two thirds of the legislature. On the same day, the Legislative Assembly voted to remove the five justices of the Supreme Court's constitutional court and Raúl Melara, El Salvador's attorney general. The event has been condemned as a self-coup by opposition politicians, accusing Bukele and Nuevas Ideas of committing a power grab. The incident was condemned by the United States and has been cited as an instance of democratic backsliding.

COVID-19 pandemic

The first case of COVID-19 in El Salvador was confirmed on 19 March 2020. As of 5 January 2023, El Salvador had 201,785 confirmed cases and 4,230 deaths, and as of 16 December 2022, 11,343,183 doses of the vaccine had been administered.

On 21 March 2020, Bukele instated a nationwide lockdown in an effort to combat the COVID-19 pandemic which was to last 30 days. During the lockdown, 4,236 people were arrested by the National Civil Police for violating the lockdown order. Human rights organizations, such as Human Rights Watch, have criticized the arrests, citing arbitrary arrests and police abuses. Human Rights Watch also criticized the living conditions of prisoners in El Salvador following Bukele's authorization of the "use of lethal force" by the National Civil Police and the government's release of prisoners being lined up in San Salvador, referring to the living conditions as being "inhumane" and being critical of the move, especially as it was during the COVID-19 pandemic. On 27 May 2020, the United States donated 250 ventilators to El Salvador. During the press conference where Bukele received the ventilators, he stated that he took Hydroxychloroquine. On 22 June 2020, Bukele inaugurated the Hospital El Salvador, the largest hospital in Latin America used exclusively for treating cases of COVID-19, having a capacity of 400 beds, 105 intensive care units, 295 intermediate care units, and 240 doctors.

In January 2021, Transparency International cited both El Salvador and Colombia as examples of "an explosion of irregularities and corruption." Transparency International cited the Corruption Perceptions Index of 2020 as its basis. Twenty of Bukele's government institutions were under investigation by the attorney general on suspicions of corruption relating to the pandemic; however, the investigations were halted after the attorney general was removed by the Legislative Assembly on 1 May 2021.

On 13 May 2021, Bukele donated 34,000 doses of the COVID-19 vaccine to several towns and villages in Honduras after pleas from local mayors for vaccines. At the time, El Salvador had received 1.9 million doses, while Honduras had only received 59,000. Bukele donated 44,000 more doses of the COVID-19 vaccine to Honduras on 19 June 2021 after Mexico had donated 154,100 doses to Honduras the day prior.

Adoption of bitcoin

On 5 June 2021, Bukele announced that he planned to introduce a bill to the Legislative Assembly which would make El Salvador the first nation to make bitcoin legal tender. The Legislative Assembly approved the bill on 8 June 2021, and it was scheduled to come into effect on 7 September 2021. On 17 June 2021, the World Bank rejected a request from El Salvador to assist with the implementation of bitcoin as legal tender, citing concerns over transparency and the environmental effects of bitcoin mining. On 24 June 2021, Athena Bitcoin stated that it intended to invest one million dollars into installing 1,500 cryptocurrency ATMs which would allow users to be able to exchange U.S. Dollars for bitcoin, and vice versa.

On 6 September 2021, Bukele announced that the Salvadoran government had bought its first 400 bitcoins. The following day, the Bitcoin Law came into effect, making bitcoin legal tender in El Salvador, which became the first country to make the digital currency legal tender. The same day, bitcoin "crashed," falling from $52,000 per bitcoin to under $43,000, reaching, at one point in the trading, "its lowest in nearly a month." Meanwhile, platforms such as Apple and Huawei weren't offering the Salvadoran government-backed digital wallet, named "Chivo", while internet servers were forced to move offline after they were overwhelmed with user registrations. Some "one thousand protesters" took the streets of San Salvador to express their opposition to the country's adoption of bitcoin.

In November 2021, Bukele announced that he planned to build the world's first bitcoin city in the southeastern region of La Unión at the base of the Conchagua volcano, which would use geothermal energy to power bitcoin mining.

By January 2022, the price of bitcoin had fallen by 45 percent since November, costing the national treasury up to $22 million in reserves. El Salvador bonds declined. The International Monetary Fund (IMF) stalled its talks with the government on a loan deal, urging El Salvador to drop bitcoin as legal tender due to concerns over its volatility and diminished transparency. Economist Steve Hanke said, "El Salvador now has the most distressed sovereign debt in the world, and it’s because of the bitcoin folly. The markets think that Bukele's gone mad, and he has." , the Salvadoran government has lost $56 million dollars in bitcoin, and economists state that the country is likely going to default on its debt.

On 27 July 2022, Bukele announced that the Salvadoran government would buy back US$560 million in debt bonds by 2023 and 2025 to "ease worries" that the country would default on its debt. In September 2022, Bukele mocked the Bank of England on Twitter after the pound sterling fell to its all-time lowest exchange rate to the US dollar, tweeting "told you" in reference to a tweet from November 2021 criticizing the Bank of England for "printing money out of thin air".

Murder rate and crime

On 20 June 2019, Bukele announced his "Territorial Control Plan" which would increase policing of certain areas of the country in an effort to combat high crime rates and gangs in the country. Both the National Civil Police and the Armed Forces of El Salvador (FAES) would also be equipped with better firearms, ammunition, and vests as a part of the Territorial Control Plan. As a result of his Territorial Control Plan, El Salvador's homicide rate fell from 52 homicides per 100,000 people in 2018, the highest in the world at the time, to 36 homicides per 100,000 people in 2019. In 2020, the homicide rate fell to 19.7 homicides per 100,000 people, and by 2021, it decreased again to 17.6 homicides per 100,000 people. InSight Crime referred the homicide rate of 2021 as "unimaginable," as, only six years prior in 2015, the homicide rate was 103 homicides per 100,000 people. In January 2023, Minister of Defense René Merino Monroy announced that the government registered 496 homicides in 2022, a 56.8 percent decrease from 1,147 homicides in 2021. He attributed the decrease in homicides on the gang crackdown.

Accusations of negotiations with gangs 

In September 2020, the website El Faro accused Bukele of having secretly negotiated a deal with Mara Salvatrucha (MS-13), the most powerful gang in the country, which stipulated the government granting the gang more flexible prison conditions for its members and other promises, in exchange for the gang pledging to reduce the number of murders in the country and to support Bukele's political party during the upcoming 2021 elections, similar to the gang truce formulated by President Mauricio Funes from 2012 to 2014 with MS-13 and 18th Street Gang (Barrio 18). Bukele denied the allegations and shared photos of the prisons from that April, which showed gang members rounded up in cramped conditions. Bukele subsequently launched an investigation into El Faro on suspicions of money laundering.

On 8 December 2021, the United States Department of the Treasury accused Bukele of secretly negotiating with Mara Salvatrucha and 18th Street Gang to lower murder rates in the country. The department sanctioned Osiris Luna Meza, Vice Minister of Justice and Public Security, and Carlos Marroquín Chica, chairman of its Social Fabric Reconstruction Unit, alleging that they repeatedly negotiated with the gangs. Bukele rejected the accusations, stating that the United States sought "absolute submission" from El Salvador instead of cooperation.

2022–23 gang crackdown 

On 26 March 2022, El Salvador recorded 62 murders committed in a single day, the deadliest day in Salvadoran history in 30 years since the end of the civil war. Most of the murders were committed by MS-13 and 18th Street Gang. The following day, the Legislative Assembly voted to enact article 29 of the Salvadoran constitution, declaring a 30-day state of emergency, referred to as the "Régimen de Excepción" ("State of Exception"), which suspended some constitutional civil liberties and mobilized the military to neighborhoods controlled by the country's criminal gangs. According to the national police, a total of 65,291 alleged gang members, which Bukele and the police refer to as "terrorists," were arrested as of 6 March 2023,  days since the declaration of a state of emergency.

In a speech to 1,450 newly trained soldiers, Bukele threatened to not allow the incarcerated gang members to eat if gang members outside of prison continued to commit criminal acts. In the same speech, Bukele criticized the international community, specifically human rights non-governmental organizations, for "not saying anything when these criminals killed tens of Salvadoran men and women, but they leaped at attention when we began to arrest them saying that we are violating their rights," adding that the NGOs are "against human rights." He also claimed that the NGOs "need us [El Salvador] to continue to have problems, so that they can continue to make their fat salaries." Bukele also warned Salvadoran parents to keep their children away from involvement with gangs as it would lead to "prison or death."

On 23 April 2022, Bukele expressed his desire to extend the state of emergency for 30 more days, stating that he met with the Council of Ministers to petition the Legislative Assembly to vote for such an extension. The following day, 67 of the 84 deputies of the Legislative Assembly voted in favor of extending the state of emergency by 30 more days. The Legislative Assembly has since extended the state of emergency by 30 days ten additional times with 67 of the 84 deputies again voting in favor on 25 May 2022, 21 June 2022, 19 July 2022, 17 August 2022, 14 September 2022, 15 October 2022, 15 November 2022, 14 December 2022, 11 January 2023, and 14 February 2023. According to a survey conducted by CIESCA in late-May 2022, 90.13 percent of Salvadorans approved of the state of emergency and the measures taken by the government against the gangs, while only 7.10 percent did not approve.

Liz Throssell, a spokeswoman of the Office of the United Nations High Commissioner for Human Rights (OHCHR), called the actions of the police and army as resorting to an "unnecessary and excessive use of force." In early-May 2022, Human Rights Watch claimed that there was "mounting evidence" and "credible allegations" that Salvadoran authorities were committing human rights violations, such as arbitrary arrests, enforced disappearances, and deaths in police custody, throughout the state of emergency. In early June 2022, Amnesty International stated that the government has committed "massive human rights violations", including torture, against those incarcerated, and stating that 2 percent of the country's population have been incarcerated and that there have been 18 deaths in custody. Groups which advocate for freedom of the press were "alarmed" when the Legislative Assembly authorized prison sentences of 10 to 15 years to news media which spreads messages from the gangs.

On 28 June 2022, three police officers of the National Civil Police were killed by MS-13 gang members in a shootout in Santa Ana. Bukele described the shootout as an "ambush" against the police, and he referred to the three killed officers as heroes. In a news conference, Bukele swore to intensify the gang crackdown, stating, "What is coming to [gang members] is much greater, and they are going to pay dearly for having taken the lives of these three [police officers]." In response to foreign criticism regarding the crackdown, Bukele stated "Let them complain all they want [...] We are going to defend our people and we are going to ensure that the lives of these agents were not lost in vain." Similarly, on 13 July 2022, a group of soldiers was attacked by 10 gang members in Nueva Concepción, one of which was mortally wounded and died in a military hospital. Bukele also described the incident as an "ambush" and ordered the national flag to be hoisted at half-mast for three days.

In July 2022, Bukele announced the construction of a new prison which will be able to house 40,000 prisoners, making it one of the largest prisons in the world. The prison, known as the Terrorism Confinement Center and located Tecoluca, CECOT  was opened on 31 January 2023, Bukele together with his Security Cabinet, presented the prison with punishment cells, factories for workshops, access control with a full body scanner and a scanner for packages. The prison is staffed by 250 police officers, 600 soldiers, and covers 410 acres of land.

On 3 November 2022, Osiris Luna Meza, the minister of justice, announced that the government would begin destroying gravestones belonging to members of gangs to prevent them from becoming "shrines", stating "terrorists will no longer be able to 'glorify' the memory of dead criminals". Despite the destruction of the gravestones, the government stated that the bodies would remain intact and not be disturbed. Bukele compared the removal of the tombstones of gang members to denazification in Allied-occupied Germany, stating that the government policy is only aimed at gravestones that mention gang affliation and comparing this to the removal and banning of swastikas in Germany after WWII.

Accusations of corruption in government

Bukele founded the International Commission Against Impunity in El Salvador (CICIES) (es) on 6 September 2019. The institution's purpose is to combat a variety of crimes, including drug trafficking, corruption, and white collar crimes. He also established an anti-corruption unit within the National Civil Police (PNC) which would cooperate directly with CICIES.

On 17 May 2021, the United States named five of Bukele's ministers and aides as being corrupt. The five officials named were Rogelio Rivas, Guillermo Gallegos, José Luis Merino, Sigfrido Reyes, and Carolina Recinos. Following the report, the United States diverted funding to El Salvador away from government institutions, instead giving funding to civil society groups. On 4 June 2021, Bukele placed Ernesto Muyshondt, who succeeded Bukele as Mayor of San Salvador from 2018 to 2021, under house arrest on suspicions of electoral fraud and illegal negotiations with gangs to gain votes for ARENA in the 2014 presidential election. Muyshondt had just been named by Luis Almagro, the General Secretary of the Organization of American States (OAS), as one of his anti-corruption advisors, and as a result, El Salvador withdrew from the Organization of American States' anti-corruption accord.

On 30 October 2021, Bukele and Nuevas Ideas accused two deputies of the legislative assembly, José Ilofio García Torres and Gerardo Balmore Aguilar Soriano, of "conspiracy against the political institution" for allegedly being bribed with "perks" such as U.S. citizenship by the embassy of the United States in San Salvador and Roy García, a vocal opponent of Bukele's presidency. An audio recording of the two deputies allegedly recorded a meeting between the deputies, García, and the U.S. embassy negotiating an agreement to fracture 15 to 25 deputies of Nuevas Ideas from the party to oppose Bukele's political agenda in the Legislative Assembly. Both deputies were subsequently ousted from Nuevas Ideas amidst an ongoing investigation into the incident. The U.S. embassy denied the allegations made by Bukele and Nuevas Ideas, stating that none of its representatives were on the audio recording.

On 11 November 2021, Bukele introduced a bill to the Legislative Assembly called the "Foreign Agents Law" with the goal of "prohibiting foreign interference" in Salvadoran political affairs. Juan Carlos Bidegain, the Minister of the Interior, stated that the law was meant to "guarantee the security, national sovereignty and social and political stability of the country." Bukele stated that the law was modeled off of the United States' Foreign Agents Registration Act (FARA), but critics have compared it to various Nicaraguan laws which institute press censorship by shutting down organizations and arresting journalists. Human Rights Watch reported on 16 December 2021 that 91 Twitter accounts belonging to journalists, lawyers, and activists were blocked by Bukele and various government institutions.

Foreign policy

Other world leaders Bukele has met with include Japanese Prime Minister Shinzo Abe in November 2019, Guatemalan President Alejandro Giammattei in January 2020, Turkish President Recep Tayyip Erdoğan in January 2022, and Mexican President Andrés Manuel López Obrador in May 2022. Additionally, Bukele met Hamad Bin Abdulaziz Al-Kawari, the Qatari minister of state, on the day of his inauguration on 1 June 2019, and Saad Sherida al-Kaabi, the Qatari minister of energy, in Qatar in December 2019.

Between 5 June 2019 and 22 December 2019, Bukele served as the president pro tempore of the Central American Integration System (SICA). Bukele is a proponent of Central American reunification.

Bukele considers Nicolás Maduro, the disputed president of Venezuela, Daniel Ortega, the president of Nicaragua, and Juan Orlando Hernández, the former president of Honduras, to be dictators. He refused to recognize the presidency of Manuel Merino in Peru in November 2020, describing his government as "putschist". Bukele and the Legislative Assembly denounced the results of the 2021 Nicaraguan general election, which have widely been seen by several governments as fraudulent. On 15 June 2019, Bukele withdrew El Salvador's recognition of the Sahrawi Arab Democratic Republic (SADR) and the Polisario Front in favor of improved relations with Morocco.

Relations with China 

Before becoming president, Bukele accused China of meddling in Latin American politics, especially after El Salvador withdrew recognition of Taiwan. In 2018, however, Félix Ulloa, Bukele's vice president, has stated that El Salvador would not restore relations with Taiwan. In December 2019, Bukele signed a "gigantic" infrastructure agreement with China for an unknown amount. Bukele met with Chinese President Xi Jinping in China in December 2019.

On 9 November 2022, Bukele announced that El Salvador and China had entered negotiations for a free trade agreement between the two countries. China donated fertilizer and wheat flour to El Salvador, and according to a Salvadoran government official, China also offered to buy El Salvador's external bond debt.

Relations with the United States 

Bukele met with U.S. President Donald Trump on 26 September 2019 in Washington, D.C., where he called on Trump to promote legal migration in an effort to combat illegal immigration, and to maintain the Temporary Protected Status (TPS) policy for Salvadorans living in the United States. He later confirmed on 28 October 2019 that the United States was continuing TPS for Salvadorans.

In June 2019, Bukele stated that his government would no longer recognize Maduro as the president of Venezuela, instead, recognizing Juan Guaidó as Venezuela's legitimate president amidst Venezuela's presidential crisis. The action was welcomed by Ronald D. Johnson, the United States' ambassador to El Salvador. On 3 November 2019, he expelled Venezuelan diplomats, who were appointed by Maduro, from El Salvador. Bukele showed his displeasure when the United States spoke with Maduro in March 2022, accusing the United States of "deciding who is bad and who is good and also when the bad becomes good and the good becomes bad."

In February 2021, Bukele arrived in the United States to meet U.S. President Joe Biden, but Biden refused to meet Bukele. Bukele did not attend the 9th Summit of the Americas of June 2022 due to frustrations over the U.S. government's allegations of corruption and human rights abuses committed by his government. After the Federal Bureau of Investigation (FBI) executed a search warrant of former President Trump's home on 8 August 2022, Bukele criticized the FBI, asking on Twitter, "What would the US Government say, if OUR police raided the house of one of the main possible contenders of OUR 2024 presidential election?"

Norma Torres, a U.S. congresswoman representing California's 35th congressional district, has been a critic of Bukele and his administration since the two of them engaged in an argument on Twitter regarding the U.S. migrant crisis on the southern border. She stated that she "sleeps with a gun nearby" after her social media accounts were sent "hateful messages" and images of Bukele as a result of their argument. On 10 November 2022, after the 2022 elections for the 35th congressional district, Torres accused Bukele of interfering in the election for endorsing Republican challenger Mike Cargile.

Reelection campaign

On 31 August 2021, the Legislative Assembly passed a number of bills, including one that forced the departure of all judges over the age of 60 or those having served over 30 years, affecting about a third of the judiciary. A few days later, on 3 September 2021, the Supreme Court ruled that the president is eligible to serve two consecutive terms in office, overturning a previous ruling 2014 stating that presidents must wait ten years until being eligible to run for reelection. The court ruling allows Bukele to run for reelection in the 2024 general election. The Supreme Electoral Court accepted the court's ruling.

The ruling was protested by both ARENA and the FMLN, with a representative of ARENA calling the ruling a "precursor to a dictatorship," and a representative from the FMLN stating that the state is serving only one person, referring to Bukele. The ruling was also condemned by the U.S. government, as stated by Jean Elizabeth Manes, the chargé d'affaires of the United States to El Salvador, claiming that the ruling was "clearly contrary to the Salvadoran constitution." According the Manes, the ruling was a direct result of the legislature replacing the judges of the Supreme Court in May 2021. José Miguel Vivanco, the executive director of the Americas Division of Human Rights Watch, stated that El Salvador was heading down the same path as Honduras and Nicaragua in allowing presidents to be reelected, adding, "democracy in El Salvador is on the edge of the abyss".

During a speech celebrating the country's 201st anniversary of independence from Spain on 15 September 2022, Bukele officially announced that he will be running for reelection in 2024. Constitutional lawyers criticized his announcement, stating that presidential reelection violates "at least" four articles of the country's constitution. Polling conducted after his announcement indicate that around 90 percent of Salvadorans would support Bukele's reelection campaign.

Presidential approval rating

Despite being described as an autocrat, a caudillo, an authoritarian, and a strongman, and despite proclaiming himself as the "Dictator of El Salvador", the "coolest dictator in the world", and the "Emperor of El Salvador", by way of irony by the accusations, Bukele has retained a high approval rating throughout his presidency, making him the most popular president in Salvadoran history. He is considered by some journalists to be one of the most domestically popular world leaders and heads of state due to his approval ratings hovering around 87 percent.

Personal life

Family 

Bukele was born into a Christian household, although his father converted to Islam later in life. As the son of a Muslim father and a Christian mother, Bukele's religious beliefs were a controversial subject in the 2019 election, with an image surfacing showing Bukele praying at the mosque in Mexico City. In February 2018, The Times of Israel published an image of Bukele "in deep reflection at the Western Wall in Jerusalem's Old City."

Bukele has publicly stated he considers himself a believer in God first rather than religion. In a 2015 interview he said that "I am not a person who believes much in the liturgy of religions. However, I believe in God, in Jesus Christ. I believe in his word, I believe in his word revealed in the Holy Bible. And I know that God does not reject anyone because of their origins."

He married Gabriela Rodríguez, a psychologist and educator, on 6 December 2014. In 2018, Bukele told the Mayor of Jerusalem, Nir Barkat, that Rodríguez has "Jewish-Sephardic blood". The couple has one child, named Layla, who was born during Bukele's presidency in August 2019.

Cultural activities

Bukele has promoted surfing as a part of El Salvador's tourism market. El Salvador hosted the 2021 ISA World Surfing Games, and he confirmed El Salvador will also host the 2023 ISA World Surfing Games.

In January 2023, Bukele announced that El Salvador would host the Miss Universe at the end of the year. He stated, "I am deeply honored to announce that El Salvador will host the next Miss Universe pageant at the end of this year. El Salvador is a country with great beauty, volcanoes, exquisite coffee and we have become the safest country in Latin America". The last time El Salvador hosted the beauty pageant was in 1975.

Political views
Bukele's political views have sometimes been referred to by some journalists as the ideology of "Bukelism".

Public transport 
Bukele promised to sanction bus carriers that increase the rates established by law. Elements of the Police were deployed in different parts of the country to guarantee compliance with the regulations. During his presidential campaign, Bukele proposed the construction of a new airport in the east of the country to relieve congestion from El Salvador's main airport and bring an economic boost to the country's east. On 26 April 2022, the Legislative Assembly passed a law to begin construction of the Airport of the Pacific and the Train of the Pacific. The new rail network will be 332 miles (535 kilometers) long, and the new airport will be 126,530 square feet (11,755 square meters) in size in La Unión.

Social issues
Bukele is a right-wing populist. He has stated that he opposes abortion, including in cases of rape, incest, and when the mother's life is at risk. Bukele has stated: "I think, in the end, in the future, we're going to realize that [abortion] is a great genocide that we’ve committed." Bukele has stated that he is opposed to same-sex marriage and believes marriage is between "a man and woman." In September 2021, Bukele stated that the Legislative Assembly would not decriminalize abortion, legalize same-sex marriage, or legalize euthanasia in any potential constitutional reforms.

Emigration
In an interview with Fox News' Tucker Carlson, Bukele attributed mass emigration from Central America to the United States to the region's "lack of economic opportunity" and "lack of security," and described the status quo as "immoral," arguing that emigration not only strains the United States, but also impedes domestic efforts to improve living conditions in El Salvador. In an interview with VICE News' Krishna Andavolu shortly after his inauguration, Bukele stated, "I share the same concern President Trump [has with] immigration, but for different reasons. [...] He doesn't want our people to go; I don't want our people to leave."

Depictions in popular culture 

Bukele was listed by Time as one of the 100 most influential people of 2021.

A character inspired by Bukele called "Nashim Bupele" appeared on the Korean drama Becoming Witch. In the show's seventh episode, one of the characters mentioned that he is a personal friend of Nashim Bupele, briefly showing his image, and how El Salvador became the first country to make bitcoin its legal tender. Bukele ironized the drama by describing the actor as a "questionable choice".

Electoral history

Notes

References

Citations

Bibliography

Further reading

External links

 Biography by CIDOB (in Spanish)
 Biography on Official Presidential Website (in Spanish)

 
1981 births
Living people
Nayib
Presidents of El Salvador
Mayors of San Salvador
Farabundo Martí National Liberation Front politicians
People from San Salvador
People from San Salvador Department
Salvadoran people of Palestinian descent
Palestinian people
Yamaha Corporation
21st-century Salvadoran politicians
Nuevas Ideas politicians